Philip A. Shaw is a British philologist who is Associate Professor of English Language and Old English at the University of Leicester.

Biography
Philip A. Shaw received his B.A. in English Language and Literature at the University of Oxford, and his Ph.D. in the Institute for Medieval Studies at the University of Leeds. Following postdoctoral work and a position as lecturer in Old and Middle English at the University of Sheffield, Shaw joined the School of English at the University of Leicester in 2009, where he is now Associate Professor in English Language and Old English. Shaw is a Fellow of the Higher Education Academy. He specializes in the languages and literatures of the Middle Ages, particularly Old Norse language and literature, and Old English language and literature. He is also an authority on Germanic religion. Shaw has written numerous works on these subjects.

Select bibliography
 (Edited with Penny Eley, Penny Simons, Catherine Hanley and Mario Longtin) Partonopeus de Blois: An Electronic Edition, 2006
 (Edited with Richard Corradini, Christina Pössel and Rob Meens) Texts and identities in the early Middle Ages, 2006
 (With Charles Barber and Joan C. Beal) The English Language: A Historical Introduction, 2009
 Pagan Goddesses in the Early Germanic World: Eostre, Hreda and the Cult of Matrons, 2011
 Names and Naming in 'Beowulf': Studies in Heroic Narrative Tradition (Bloomsbury Academic, 2020),

See also
 Alaric Hall
 Leonard Neidorf

References

Academics of the University of Leicester
Anglo-Saxon studies scholars
Alumni of the University of Cambridge
Alumni of the University of Leeds
Living people
British non-fiction writers
British philologists
Germanic studies scholars
Old Norse studies scholars
Year of birth missing (living people)